Daniel Ricardo Camarena (born November 9, 1992) is an American professional baseball pitcher in the San Diego Padres organization. He has played in Major League Baseball (MLB) for the Padres. He was drafted by the New York Yankees in the 20th round of the 2011 Major League Baseball draft. Camarena spent a day on the Yankees' active roster in 2019, but did not appear in a game, earning him the distinction of being a "phantom ballplayer". He remained a phantom ballplayer until he made his MLB debut with the Padres in 2021. On July 8, 2021, he became the first relief pitcher to hit a grand slam since 1985, and the first pitcher since 1898 to do so on his first hit. With the universal DH added in 2022, Camarena will likely remain the last reliever to ever hit a grand slam.

Career

New York Yankees
Camarena was drafted by the New York Yankees in the 20th round, 629th overall, of the 2011 Major League Baseball draft out of Cathedral Catholic High School. On August 16, 2011, Camarena signed with the Yankees over slot value, signing for $335K.

On July 6, 2019, Camarena was selected to the 40-man roster and promoted to the major leagues for the first time. However, he was optioned to Triple-A the next day without appearing in a game. On August 13, 2019, Camarena was released by the Yankees organization.

San Diego Padres
On February 13, 2020, Camarena signed a minor league contract with the San Diego Padres organization. He did not play in a game in 2020 due to the cancellation of the minor league season because of the COVID-19 pandemic.

On July 19, 2020, Camarena was added to the Padres’ 60-man player pool for the pandemic-shortened season, but spent the year at the alternate training site without making an MLB appearance. He was assigned to the Triple-A El Paso Chihuahuas to begin the 2021 season.

Camerena was named the Triple-A West pitcher of the week for the week of June 7–13, 2021. On June 18, the Padres' added Camarena to their taxi squad. The next day, he was selected to the active roster. He made his MLB debut that day against the Cincinnati Reds, pitching 2.2 innings and allowing 3 earned runs. In the game, he also notched his first career strikeout, punching out Reds infielder Mike Freeman.

On July 8, 2021, Camarena hit a grand slam off Washington Nationals pitcher Max Scherzer, sparking a comeback from an 8–2 deficit which resulted in a 9–8 victory for the Padres. This made Camarena the first MLB relief pitcher to hit a grand slam since Don Robinson in 1985, and the first pitcher to hit a grand slam for his first career hit since Bill Duggleby of the Philadelphia Phillies in 1898, and the second Padres pitcher since Mike Corkins who hit one off the Reds in 1970. Camarena would appear in 6 major league games for San Diego, posting a 9.64 ERA with 7 strikeouts. On October 30, Camarena was outrighted off of the 40-man roster and elected free agency on November 7.

On January 26, 2022, Camarena re-signed with the Padres on a minor league contract. On April 7, Camarena was released by the Padres. Camarena re-signed with the Padres organization on a new minor league contract on April 14 before he was placed on the 60-day injured list on April 19 after undergoing Tommy John surgery.

References

External links

1992 births
Living people
People from Bonita, California
Baseball players from California
Major League Baseball pitchers
San Diego Padres players
Gulf Coast Yankees players
Charleston RiverDogs players
Trenton Thunder players
Tampa Yankees players
Scranton/Wilkes-Barre RailRiders players
Sacramento River Cats players
Richmond Flying Squirrels players
Rochester Red Wings players
El Paso Chihuahuas players